Foulsham is a village and civil parish in the English county of Norfolk. Foulsham is renowned in the local area for its unspoilt nature and the number of Sixteenth and Seventeenth Century buildings.

History
Foulsham name is of Anglo-Saxon origin and derives from the Old English for Fugol's homestead or village.

Foulsham has been the site of major Bronze Age discoveries including a golden torc ploughed-up in 1846 and a hoard of 141 copper-socketed axeheads, discovered in 1953 and now in the care of Norwich Castle Museum.

In the Domesday Book, Foulsham is listed as a settlement of 103 households in the hundred of Eynesford. In 1086, the village was part of the East Anglian estates of King William I. The worth of Foulsham is recorded as two churches, a mill, twelve cattle, four hundred pigs, fifty goats and 13 sesters of honey.

Old Hall Farm was built in the parish in the Sixteenth Century and was at one time the residence of Maj-Gen. Philip Skippon, a Parliamentarian commander at the Battle of Naseby.

In the Seventeenth Century, Foulsham was a thriving market place until a store of gunpowder exploded on the 15 June 1770 which led to a fire that consumed the whole market place.

RAF Foulsham opened in 1942 as an air-base for various squadrons of No. 3 Group and No. 100 Group RAF throughout the Second World War. On 28 July 1943, RAF Foulsham was the site of a forced landing by a B-17 Flying Fortress piloted by John C. Morgan after a strategic bombing raid of Hanover. For his actions, Morgan was awarded the Medal of Honor. The airbase was retired in 1945 and the Ministry of Defence eventually sold the land in the 1980s.

Geography
According to the 2011 Census, Foulsham has a population of 1,021 residents living in 444 households.

Foulsham falls within the constituency of Broadland and is represented at Parliament by Jerome Mayhew MP of the Conservative Party. For the purposes of local government, the parish falls within the district of Broadland.

Church of the Holy Innocents
The chancel of Foulsham's parish church dates largely from the Fourteenth Century with the rest of the church being constructed in the Fifteenth Century, the church was restored in the Nineteenth Century. The church roof has been recently restored and the font is likely a Nineteenth Century copy of a Sixteenth Century original.

Amenities
Foulsham still has a public house, known as the Queen's Head, which has operated on its current site since the mid-Nineteenth Century.

The majority of local children attend Foulsham Primary School, which was rated as 'Good' by Ofsted in 2020.

Puritan emigration
The village gave its name to a family of Puritan dissidents, who fled England for the town of Hingham, Massachusetts (and later Exeter, New Hampshire) and whose spelling of the name was slightly changed to Folsom. Today, these American descendants of Foulsham have given rise to Folsom, California, Folsom Street in San Francisco, Folsom Prison (all named for California pioneer and New Hampshire native Joseph Libbey Folsom), as well as General Nathaniel Folsom, who represented New Hampshire in the Continental Congress.

Transport
Foulsham railway station opened in 1882 as a stop on the Great Eastern Railway line between Aylsham South and County School. The station closed in 1964 as part of the Beeching cuts, with Foulsham's closest railway station today being Sheringham for Bittern Line services to Cromer and Norwich. 

The nearest airport is Norwich International Airport.

Notable Residents
 Maj-Gen. Philip Skippon (1600-1660)- Parliamentarian officer 
 John Astley (1735-1803)- British clergyman and Rector of Foulsham, 1771-1803

War Memorial
Foulsham's war memorial takes the form of a stone obelisk above an octagonal plinth, located in an island in Foulsham High Street. The memorial lists the following names for the First World War:

 SSG Percy Arnold (d.1919), Royal Engineers
 Pvt. Albert Budrey (d.1917), 2nd Bn., Bedfordshire Regiment
 Pvt. H. William Hipkin (1885-1917), 1st Bn., Royal Fusiliers
 Pvt. Robin H. Stroulger (1884-1917), 11th Bn., Middlesex Regiment
 Pvt. Donald E. Scarfe (1893-1915), 7th Bn., Royal Norfolk Regiment
 Pvt. Alfred W. Stroulger (1886-1917), 7th Bn., Royal Norfolk Regt.
 Pvt. Charles Calver (1890-1917), 9th Bn., Royal Norfolk Regt.
 Pvt. Charles Amiss (1889-1917), 7th Bn., York and Lancaster Regiment
 Rfn. Edgar Hendry (1887-1917), 18th Bn., King's Royal Rifle Corps
 Alfred Barber
 Albert Brown
 Stanley Everitt
 Bertrand Fowler
 William Hendry
 George Hill
 Charles Jarvis
 George Laing
 Harry Massingham
 Herbert Massingham
 Samuel Mitchell
 John Prior
 Victor Russell
 George Lane
 George Seaman

And, the following for the Second World War:

 Cpl. Frederick S. Girling (1912-1943), 5th Bn., Royal Norfolk Regiment
 Cpl E. Reginald Margetson (1916-1943), 5th Bn., Royal Norfolk Regt.
 Pvt. Alan Blake (1925-1945), 13th (South Lancashire) Bn., Parachute Regiment
 Ronald Allen
 Arthur Cole
 George Farrow
 Gordon Fletcher
 Arthur Frost
 Victor George
 Leonard Gray

References

External Links

Broadland
Villages in Norfolk
Civil parishes in Norfolk